The Megacraniinae are an anareolate subfamily of stick insects in the family Phasmatidae.  Their known distribution includes Malesia and islands in the Pacific and Indian oceans.  Several genera have been revised and were placed previously in the Platycraninae.

Genera
The Phasmida Species File lists:
 Acanthograeffea Günther, 1932
 Apterograeffea Cliquennois & Brock, 2002
 Davidrentzia  - monotypic D. valida Brock & Hasenpusch, 2007
 Erastus Redtenbacher, 1908
 Graeffea Brunner von Wattenwyl, 1868
 Megacrania Kaup, 1871
 Ophicrania Kaup, 1871
 Xenomaches Kirby, 1896 - monotypic Xenomaches incommodus (Butler, 1876)

References

External links

Phasmatodea subfamilies
Phasmatodea of Asia